Wacoworld is an album by the Chicago-based cowpunk band the Waco Brothers, released in 1999.

Production
Wacoworld'''s songs were written by Jon Langford and Dean Schlabowske. Poi Dog Pondering's horn section played on some of the album's tracks.

Critical receptionNo Depression wrote that Schlabowske's "heavy, blue-collar vocal presence is a delight, especially on the soon-to-be-abducted-by-aliens weeper 'Hello To Everybody' and the outlawish 'Red Brick Wall'." Robert Christgau thought that Langford and Schlabowske "sing so lustily that the band's indifference to the niceties of country as it exists in history is of no consequence." The Washington Post opined that "forays into blues and Western swing aren't enough to keep Waco World interesting when Langford's distinctive songs yield to Schlabowske's merely competent ones." CMJ New Music Report decided that "the entire album brims with rough-hewn vocals, twangy electricity, and a cool, literary bent." Spin'' deemed it "flesh'n'blood country-western insurgence."

AllMusic lamented that "the English cowboy gag is wearing thin."

Track listing
All tracks composed by the Waco Brothers

Personnel
Mr. Tracey Dear - mandolin
Cover Boy Doughty - bass
Leopard Boy Goulding - drums
Jonboy - vocals, guitar
Deano - guitar, vocals
Durante - steel guitar, 12-string electric guitar
with:
Rico Bell - vocals on "Pigsville"
Kelly Hogan - vocals on "The Hand That Throws the Bottle Down"
Barkley McKay - organ on "Hello Everybody", piano on "Red Brick Wall"
Paul Martens - saxophone on "Red Brick Wall" and "Corrupted"
Dave Max Crawford - trumpet on "Red Brick Wall" and "Broken Down Wall", accordion on "Broken Down Wall"
Rick Cookin' Sherry - washboard on "Red Brick Wall"
John Rice - fiddle on "The Hand That Throws the Bottle Down" and "Day of the Dead"

References

1999 albums
Bloodshot Records albums